The following is a list of churches in Rutland.

There are no active churches in the civil parishes of Ayston, Barleythorpe, Barrow, Beaumont Chase, Burley, Gunthorpe, Leighfield, Martinsthorpe, Normanton, Thorpe by Water and Wardley. The Church of England parish churches of Ayston,  Burley,  Normanton and Wardley survive but are redundant. The Churches Conservation Trust maintains Ayston, Burley, Tickencote and Wardley.

The county has an estimated 57 active churches for 38,600 inhabitants, a ratio of one church for every 677 people.

Defunct churches

References 

Rutland
 
Churches